Abdo Khal (born 3, August 1962, Al-Mijannah, Jizan, Saudi Arabia) is an Arab writer and winner of the 2010 International Prize for Arabic Fiction.

Biography
He left his home village at a young age and currently lives in Jeddah. Before becoming a writer, Khal has been working as a journalist since 1982.  His works, written in a distinctive style that blends Qur'anic Arabic with dialectal (specifically Hijazi) Arabic, have made him known within and beyond the Arab world. Khal studied political science before becoming a novelist and his works criticize the corruption of the very wealthy in the Arab world. They are unavailable in his home country. According to himself, this is because they "address the sacrosanct trio of taboos in the Arab world: sex, politics, and religion". Due to Khal winning the International Prize for Arabic Fiction, his works are expected to soon be translated into various languages and become more known outside the Arabic-speaking world. Indeed, some of Khal's work have been translated and published in English, German and French.

Work 
Khal works as the Editor-in-chef and a daily columnist of Ukaz newspaper. Moreover, he is member of the Board of Directors of Jeddah Literary Club.

Bibliography
 Cities Eating Grass
 Immorality
 The Mud
 Death Passes from Here
 Days Don't Hide Anyone
 Barking
 She Throws Sparks

References

External links 
 CNN.com: 'Terrifying' Saudi novel wins Arabic Booker
 Abdo Khal at the Emirates Airline Festival of Literature
 Interview with the Saudi Arabian Writer Abdo Khal: The Discovery of Arabic Literature in the Gulf

Living people
1962 births
Saudi Arabian novelists
International Prize for Arabic Fiction winners